Grizzly Mountain may refer to:

 Grizzly Mountain (Canada), Hermit Range, British Columbia
 Grizzly Mountain (Colorado)
 Grizzly Mountain (Montana), a mountain in Glacier National Park
 Grizzly Mountain (Oregon), a mountain
 Grizzly Mountain (film), a 1997 American film

See also
 Grizzly Peak (disambiguation)
 Escape to Grizzly Mountain, a 2000 American film and sequel to the above film